The Billboard Music Award for Top Streaming Artist winners and nominees.

Winners and nominees

Most wins and nominations

Wins

 3 (Drake)

Nominations

7 (Drake)
3 (Nicki Minaj, Rihanna, Post Malone, The Weeknd)
2 (Justin Bieber, Psy, Ariana Grande, Cardi B, DaBaby, Lil Nas X)

References

Billboard awards